Salix shiraii is a species of willow native to mountains of central Honshū, Japan. It is a deciduous shrub.

References 

shiraii